The Jigme Namgyel Engineering College (earlier known as Royal Bhutan Polytechnic, Royal Bhutan Institute of Technology and Jigme Namgyel Polytechnic) is a constituent colleges of the Royal University of Bhutan. It was established in 1972, coinciding with the third five-year economic development plan.

History 

It started with infrastructure development in 2018 and started offering diploma-level programmes in civil and electrical engineering from 22 February 1974. The course in mechanical engineering was introduced in 1988. In the early '70s, it offered certificate-level courses in surveying and draughting. (The courses in surveying and draughting were discontinued from the late '80s.)

Vision 

"A premier Institute of applied engineering, management and technology towards developing highly competent and innovative technical personnel infused with the values of Gross National Happiness."

Mission 

 To provide quality education, driven by GNH values, in the field of applied engineering, management and technology that are current and beneficial to individuals, employers and the nation;
 To conduct research and innovation in relevant areas;
 To provide resourceful services through professional development training, consultancy and expert services; and
 To develop active linkages with organizations and academic institutions both within and outside the country.

References

External links 
To know more about Jigme Namgyel Engineering College, visit the college website.
 
 

Colleges in Bhutan
Educational institutions established in 1972
1970s establishments in Bhutan